Thurmon Maurice "Mo" Spencer (born June 15, 1952) is a former professional American football player who played defensive back for four seasons for the  St. Louis Cardinals and New Orleans Saints

References

1952 births
American football cornerbacks
St. Louis Cardinals (football) players
New Orleans Saints players
North Carolina Central Eagles football players
Living people